Blasphemy is a novel by Douglas Preston that was released on January 8, 2008, by Forge Books. It is the second book in the Wyman Ford series, exploring philosophical and theological ideas.

Plot summary
Isabella, a powerful particle accelerator, has been constructed in Red Mesa in the remote Arizona desert, the most expensive machine ever built by science. The project is staffed by a team of twelve scientists, under the leadership of charismatic Nobel Laureate Gregory North Hazelius. The team consists of Kate Mercer, Hazelius's second-in-command; chief engineer and designer of Isabella Ken Dolby; Russian software engineer Peter Volkonsky; cosmologist Melissa Corcoran; senior intelligence officer and security guard Tony Wardlaw; psychologist George Innes; quantum electrodynamicist Julie Thibodeaux; electrical engineer Harlan St. Vincent; Michael Cecchini, the Standard Model particle physicist; computer engineer Rae Chen; and mathematician Alan Edelstein. When the team supposedly encounters a problem with the machine, they appear to be covering something up and not reporting all the true facts to their superiors, even after Voldonsky suddenly dies in what appears to be a suicide. Ex-CIA agent Wyman Ford is tapped to go to Arizona in an undercover role as an anthropologist, and finds out what's really going on with the project. He is reluctant to undertake the mission, having had a previous relationship with Mercer while in college and being consistently warned of Hazelius's almost seductive charisma. Once there, Ford discovers the scientists have made a discovery that apparently not only demonstrates the existence of God, but communications with it reveal it to be far grander and deeper than anything found in the conventional religions.

When part of the discovery becomes known to a local fundamentalist pastor named Russell Eddy, he interprets it as a sign of the End Times and by way of viral email recruits thousands of people from across the United States into "God's Army". They storm the machine, killing Dolby and Wardlaw, and eventually causing the machine to overload and explode, destroying the entire facility. The remaining crew members escape through the abandoned mine shafts that run into the mountain, but the explosion of Isabella causes a cave-in that kills Thibodeaux and Edelstein. They capture the remaining eight scientists and burn Hazelius at the stake. Just as they prepare to kill Ford and the other survivors, they are rescued by one of the Native American residents of the region, who evacuates them all on horseback. The final explosions and collapses of the mine shafts cause the entire area to cave in from under them, killing Eddy and a vast majority of the mob. The National Guard finally arrives just in time to save the survivors and round up the surviving mob members.

In the end, it is revealed that Hazelius simulated the communications in an effort to create a new religion, one based on science and particularly the scientific method and the search for truth. However, Hazelius himself admits to the simulation performing "beyond its specs." (Comparisons are made between Hazelius and Hubbard in regards to Scientology). However, Ford was the only one who learned the truth about Hazelius, and when he tries to tell Kate, she refuses to believe him. Out of respect for Kate's wishes and his own dying love for her, he decides to let her believe in the lie so that she may be happy. The epilogue reveals that Kate and the other five survivors of Isabella - Corcoran, Innes, St. Vincent, Cecchini, and Chen - have formed their own religion based on the experience, simply named "The Search." The religion has already garnered a massive following, with the late Hazelius serving as their Christ-like figure and the printed-out recordings of Isabella's conversations with "God" as their Bible.

Timeline
The events in this novel follow those of The Codex and Tyrannosaur Canyon (the latter being the novel that introduced Ford), and is the first novel to feature Ford as the main protagonist. It also introduces Dr. Stanton Lockwood III, the science advisor to the President of the United States, whom assigns the job to Ford. It is later succeeded by Impact and The Kraken Project, both of which feature the return of Ford and Lockwood.

Reception

—Review by Kirkus Reviews

References

External links
Book profile on the publisher's website
The real "world largest collider"

Techno-thriller novels
Novels by Douglas Preston
2008 American novels
2008 science fiction novels
Novels set in Arizona
Apache County, Arizona
Forge Books books
Novels about religion